The ARIA Albums Chart ranks the best-performing albums and extended plays (EPs) in Australia. Its data, published by the Australian Recording Industry Association, is based collectively on each album and EP's weekly physical and digital sales. In 2015, 31 albums claimed the top spot, including Taylor Swift's 1989, which started its peak position in 2014, and thirteen acts achieved their first number-one album or EP in Australia: Meghan Trainor, Kendrick Lamar, Lee Kernaghan, Sam Smith, Hermitude, Tame Impala, Northlane, Dr. Dre, Bullet for My Valentine, The Weeknd, Troye Sivan, Parkway Drive and the Royal Philharmonic Orchestra.

Chart history

Number-one artists

See also
2015 in music
List of number-one singles of 2015 (Australia)
List of Top 25 albums for 2015 in Australia

References

2015
Australia Albums
Number-one albums